"Communism in 20 years" was a slogan put forth by Nikita Khrushchev at the 22nd Congress of the Communist Party of the Soviet Union in 1961. Khrushchev's quote from his speech at the Congress was from this phrase: "We are strictly guided by scientific calculations. And calculations show that in 20 years we will build mainly a communist society".

In his speech, Khrushchev promised that communism would be built "in the main" by 1980. His assertion that "The current generation of Soviet people will live under communism" was the final phrase of the Third Program of the CPSU, which was adopted at the congress.

"[Something] will survive centuries" is a popular Russian cliché. The latter political slogan is attributed to Kremlin speechwriter Elizar Kuskov, who allegedly quipped "this slogan will survive centuries", expressing a cynical attitude as to whether the goal could genuinely be attained.

See also

 Real socialism

Notes

References 

1961 in the Soviet Union
Ideology of the Communist Party of the Soviet Union
Leninism
Nikita Khrushchev
Political catchphrases
Soviet phraseology